Crêpe paper is tissue paper that has been coated with sizing (a glue-like substance). It can then be creased in a way similar to party streamers to create gathers, giving it a crinkly texture like that of crêpe. This creasing process is called creping or crêping. 

Crepe paper is also sold flat and used as a disposable tissue paper.

Production

Paper that is creped is produced on a paper machine that has a single large steam-heated drying cylinder (yankee) fitted with a hot-air hood. The raw material is paper pulp. The Yankee cylinder is sprayed with adhesives to make the paper stick. Crêping is done by the Yankee's doctor blade that is scraping the dry paper off the cylinder surface. The crinkle (crêping) is controlled by the strength of the adhesive, geometry of the doctor blade, speed difference between the yankee and final section of the paper machine and paper pulp characteristics.

Properties
Crêpe paper and tissue are among the lightest papers and are normally below 35 g/m2.

The crêpe ratio reflects how much the paper has shortened during crêping. The figure is normally between 10 - 30%. Crêping is used to adjust the paper's stretch and thickness, both of which have a marked effect on softness and absorbency.

Crêping can also be applied to specialty papers, such as microcrêping in sack paper.

Applications
 Crêpe paper is popular for streamers and other party decorations.
 Props and costume accessories can be made of crêpe paper. It can be soaked in a small amount of water to create a dye for Easter eggs, white cardstock, and other materials.
 Crêpe paper can also be used to make paper flowers, appliqué, and paper sculpture.
 Crêpe paper is important as the backing for various types of tape, including masking tape and electrical tape.
 Can be used in place of corn husks to make tamales.
 Used in recovery systems in small model rockets.
 Crêpe paper is one of the main components used in costume building for Junkanoo the most popular street parade in the Bahamas.
 Crêpe paper can also be used as lipstick, liptint and hair color.

See also
Tissue paper
Toilet paper

Paper
Visual arts materials